is a Japanese football player. He plays for SC Sagamihara.

Career
Takumu Fujinuma joined J1 League club Omiya Ardija in 2016. On April 12, 2017, he debuted in J.League Cup (v Kashiwa Reysol). In July, he moved to Tochigi SC.

Club statistics
Updated to 1 April 2021.

References

External links
 
 
 Profile at Grulla Morioka
 Profile at Akita

1997 births
Living people
Association football people from Saitama Prefecture
Japanese footballers
J1 League players
J2 League players
J3 League players
Omiya Ardija players
Tochigi SC players
Iwate Grulla Morioka players
Blaublitz Akita players
SC Sagamihara players
Association football forwards